The posterior ligament of the head of the fibula is a part of the knee. It is a single thick and broad band, which passes obliquely upward from the back of the head of the fibula to the back of the lateral condyle of the tibia.

It is covered by the tendon of the Popliteus.

References 

Ligaments of the lower limb